Ivory Coast competed at the 1996 Summer Paralympics. The country made their Paralympic debut in Atlanta, United States., and were represented by 2 male athletes.

Medallists

See also
Côte d'Ivoire at the Paralympics
Côte d'Ivoire at the 1996 Summer Olympics

References 

Nations at the 1996 Summer Paralympics
1996
Paralympics